The USL W-League was a North American  amateur women's soccer developmental organization. The league was a semi-professional, open league, giving college players the opportunity to play alongside established international players while maintaining their collegiate eligibility. The league was administered by the United Soccer Leagues system (the USL), which also oversees the men's United Soccer League and Premier Development League. The W-League announced on November 6, 2015 that the league will cease operation ahead of 2016 season.

After the popularity of the 2019 FIFA Women's World Cup, though, USL began considerations for a new professional women's league; this effort eventually returned to the re-establishing of the league as the USL W League.

History
The W-League's inaugural season was in 1995. Originally called the United States Interregional Women's League, it later changed its name to the W-League. Although at its inception some of the league's franchises were barely above amateur level, it provided a professional outlet for many of the top female soccer players in the country.  With professionals driving the level of play, the league made a very strong debut performance.

From 1995 through the 1997 season the W-League was a single tier format (all teams at the same division).  This changed before the 1998 season when the W-League became a two tier league.  The top tier/division was called W-1 and lower division, W-2.  This division was in effect through the 2001 season – the first year of the new US Women's first division league WUSA.  The W-League returned to a single tier format in the 2002 season.

The W-League grew to a maximum of 41 teams for the 2008 season, but then began contracting rapidly.  By the time the league suspended operations in 2015, there were three, six-team conferences.  Of those 18 teams, eight went on to found United Women's Soccer (though the two Canadian teams were denied entry) and another seven joined the WPSL.

The revival of the W-League as the USL W League was announced on June 8, 2021, with eight founding teams due to begin play in 2022, none of which were revivals of teams from the original iteration of the W-League. Instead, many were associate with USL League One organizations.

Teams
127 unique teams participated in the W-League over the course of its history. Fifteen still existed (at varying levels of activity) as of 2019.

  
  
  
  (*) indicates championship

Past champions

For 1998 through 2001 the W-League was divided into two divisions: W-1 (the top division) W-2 (the lower division). The numbers in parentheses indicate the number of titles a club has won if they have won multiple titles. Click on year for W-League season summaries.
2015  Washington Spirit Reserves 2–1 Colorado Pride
2014  Los Angeles Blues (4) 6–1 Washington Spirit Reserves
2013  Pali Blues (3) 1–0 Laval Comets
2012  Ottawa Fury Women 1–1 (4–3 PSO) Pali Blues
2011  Atlanta Silverbacks Women 6–1 Ottawa Fury Women
2010  Buffalo Flash  3–1 Vancouver Whitecaps Women
2009  Pali Blues (2) 2–1 Washington Freedom Reserves
2008  Pali Blues 2–1 FC Indiana
2007  Washington Freedom 3–1 Atlanta Silverbacks Women
2006  Vancouver Whitecaps Women (2) 3–0 Ottawa Fury Women
2005  New Jersey Wildcats 3–0 Ottawa Fury Women
2004  Vancouver Whitecaps Women 0–0 (4–2 PSO) New Jersey Wildcats
2003  Hampton Roads Piranhas 1–0 Chicago Cobras
2002 Boston Renegades (2) 3–0 Charlotte Lady Eagles
2001
 W-1: Boston Renegades 5–1 Vancouver Whitecaps Women
 W-2: Charlotte Lady Eagles 3–1 Memphis Mercury
2000
 W-1: Chicago Cobras 1–1 (4–2 PSO) Raleigh Wings
 W-2: Springfield Sirens 2–1 Charlotte Lady Eagles
1999
 W-1: Raleigh Wings (2) 3 -2 Chicago Cobras (OT)
 W-2: North Texas Heat 5–1 Springfield Sirens
1998
 W-1: Raleigh Wings 4–3 Boston Renegades
 W-2: Fort Collins Force 3–1 Hampton Roads Piranhas
1997 Long Island Lady Riders (2) 2–1 Chicago Cobras (OT)
1996 Maryland Pride 3–0 Dallas Lightning
1995 Long Island Lady Riders 3–0 Southern California Nitemares

References

 
Defunct United Soccer League competitions
2
Professional sports leagues in the United States
Sports leagues established in 1995
1995 establishments in the United States
2015 disestablishments in the United States
Sports leagues disestablished in 2015